Sandi is a surname. Notable people with the surname include:

Antonio Sandi (1733–1817), Italian engraver
Federico Sandi (born 1989), Italian motorcycle racer
Hendra Sandi (born 1995), Indonesian footballer
Luis Sandi (1905–1996), Mexican musician, teacher, and composer